USS Cormorant (AMS-122/MSC-122) was a  in the United States Navy.

Construction
She was reclassified MSC-122, 7 February 1955.

East Coast Activity 
For the rest of the year Cormorant conducted minesweeping, sonar school, and other operations on the West Coast except for a brief cruise to Pearl Harbor for duty with the Naval Reserve Training Center.

Pacific Ocean operations
Sailing to the Far East, Cormorant arrived at her new home port Sasebo 22 February. She remained in the western Pacific conducting minesweeping exercises in Korean and Japanese waters and voyaging to Formosa, Okinawa, and the Philippines for training through 1960.

Cormorants final homeport was Everett, Washington, where she served as a Reserve training ship.

Decommissioning 
Cormorant was decommissioned at Everett, Washington in 1970. She was struck from the Naval Register 15 March 1974.  She was disposed of 1 December 1974, through the Defense Reutilization and Marketing Service for scrap.

Notes 

Citations

Bibliography 

Online resources

Further reading

External links 
 Dictionary of American Naval Fighting Ships
 Cormorant AMS-122
 

 

Adjutant-class minesweepers
Bluebird-class minesweepers
Ships built in Vallejo, California
1953 ships
Cold War minesweepers of the United States